In human anatomy, the pancreatic veins consist of several small blood vessels which drain the body and tail of the pancreas, and open into the trunk of the great pancreatic vein.

References 

Veins of the torso